Saint-Irenée was a local service district in Gloucester County, New Brunswick.  It is now part of the Regional Municipality of Grand Tracadie–Sheila.

History

Notable people

See also
List of communities in New Brunswick

References

Neighbourhoods in Grand Tracadie-Sheila
Former municipalities in New Brunswick